Ruth J. Person was the first woman and the seventh chancellor of the University of Michigan–Flint. In January 2014, she announced her intention to resign as chancellor and return to the faculty in the University of Michigan–Flint School of Management in January 2015. Her term as chancellor ended on July 31, 2014.

References

University of Michigan alumni
University of Michigan–Flint people
Harvard University alumni
George Washington University alumni
Catholic University of America faculty
Gettysburg College alumni
Living people
Year of birth missing (living people)